Grand Duo may refer to

 Violin Sonata in A major, D 574 (Schubert)
 Sonata in C major for piano four-hands, D 812 (Schubert)
 Grand Duo concertant (Chopin and Franchomme), cello and piano
 Gran Duo Concertante, two double basses and orchestra by Bottesini
 Grand Duo Concertant (Weber), clarinet and piano